The Double Fiancé is a 1934 Czechoslovak-German comedy film directed by Martin Frič. It is a German-language version of the Czech film Life Is a Dog, shot at the same time with a German-speaking cast by the same director.

Cast
 Fritz Kampers as Composer Viktor Lange / Professor Alfred Ritter, his uncle
 Jakob Tiedtke as Roland, Music publisher
 Lien Deyers as Eva, Roland's daughter
 Carsta Löck as Helene, Roland's daughter
 Werner Jantsch as Morrison
  as Landlord
  as Customer

See also
 Life Is a Dog (1933)

References

External links
 

1934 films
1934 comedy films
1934 multilingual films
1930s German-language films
Films of Nazi Germany
German black-and-white films
Czechoslovak black-and-white films
Films directed by Martin Frič
German multilingual films
German comedy films
1930s German films